Iberotrechus bolivari is a species of beetle in the family Carabidae, the only species in the genus Iberotrechus.

References

Trechinae